Arizelocichla is a genus of greenbuls, songbirds in the bulbul family (Pycnonotidae). The genus was revived in 2010 when twelve species of bulbuls from the genus Andropadus were separated and re-classified in the genus Arizelocichla.

Taxonomy
A molecular phylogenetic study of the bulbuls published in 2007 found that the genus Andropadus was polyphyletic. As part of a reorganization to create monophyletic genera, 12 species from Andropadus were moved to the resurrected genus Arizelocichla that had been introduced in 1905 by the American ornithologist Harry C. Oberholser with the mountain greenbul as the type species. The name Arizelocichla combines the Ancient Greek arizēlos meaning "conspicuous" or "admirable" with kikhlē meaning "thrush".

Species
The genus contains the following 12 species:

 Cameroon greenbul (Arizelocichla montana)
 Western greenbul (Arizelocichla tephrolaema)
 Kakamega greenbul (Arizelocichla kakamegae)
 Shelley's greenbul (Arizelocichla masukuensis)
 Uluguru greenbul (Arizelocichla neumanni)
 Black-browed greenbul (Arizelocichla fusciceps)
 Yellow-throated greenbul (Arizelocichla chlorigula)
 Olive-breasted greenbul (Arizelocichla kikuyuensis)
 Mountain greenbul (Arizelocichla nigriceps)
 Olive-headed greenbul (Arizelocichla olivaceiceps)
 Stripe-faced greenbul (Arizelocichla striifacies)
 Stripe-cheeked greenbul (Arizelocichla milanjensis)

References

Moyle, R. G., and B. D. Marks. 2006. Phylogenetic relationships of the bulbuls (Aves: Pycnonotidae) based on mitochondrial and nuclear DNA sequence data. Molecular Phylogenetics and Evolution 40: 687–695.

External links

 
Greenbuls
Taxa named by Harry C. Oberholser
Taxonomy articles created by Polbot